Jahngir Jan "Janne" Mian (born 6 September 1965) is a Swedish football coach.

Timeline
 1998 Söderbärke Goif Div 4 Assistant (playing) 
 1999 Islinby IK Div 4 Assistant coach
 2000 Forssa BK Juniors Head coach
 2001–2005 IK Brage Assistant coach Swedish Second division and Tipselit (elite youth) Head coach
 2006 Swedish Football Association(Talent developer)
 2007 – May 2010 Hammarby IF Fitness coach/assistant coach
 January–September 2010 Vasalund U18
 September 2010 – 2012 Sportsmanager and coach U14 Boo FF/Nacka FF

References

1965 births
IF Elfsborg managers
Living people
Swedish footballers
Hammarby Fotboll non-playing staff
Swedish football managers
Association footballers not categorized by position